Venus is a town in Johnson and Ellis counties in the U.S. state of Texas. The population was 4,361 in 2020.

History

The town was originally named "Gossip" until its development in the late 1880s. A man by the name of J.C. Smythe purchased  of abandoned cornfields in the northeastern corner of Johnson County and began to plan a townsite. He named his new town "Venus" after the daughter of a local doctor. By 1888 the new town had a post office and a population of around 10 residents. Being at the junction of two major railroads, Venus prospered and for a time was one of the fastest-growing communities in Johnson County. By the 1920s, Venus had its own schools (including a small college), several businesses, a weekly newspaper (the Venus Express), and a population that exceeded 800.

The Great Depression had massive negative impact, however, and in the 1930s the town began to decline. Growth of the Dallas–Fort Worth metroplex just to the north hastened its decline, with many of its residents relocating to the growing urban area in search of work. By 1940 the population had fallen to 200, and the only remaining operating business was the drug store.

Venus began to recover somewhat in the late 1940s, and the population soon increased back to over 300. Growth was slow but steady throughout the remainder of the 20th century; by 1990 there were 977 residents and the town had spread into neighboring Ellis County. The 2000 census listed the population as 910, but the population more than tripled to 2,960 in 2010, due largely to the southward expansion of the Metroplex.

Geography

Venus is located in northeastern Johnson County at  (32.429383, –97.107022).

U.S. Route 67 passes through the town north of its center; the highway leads northeast  to the center of Midlothian and west  to Alvarado.

Climate

The climate in this area is characterized by hot, humid summers and generally mild to cool winters. According to the Köppen Climate Classification system, Venus has a humid subtropical climate, abbreviated "Cfa" on climate maps.

Demographics

As of the 2020 United States census, there were 4,361 people, 909 households, and 740 families residing in the town.

Education

Venus is served by Venus Independent School District (www.venusisd.net), with grades K–1 attending Venus Primary School, 2–5 attending Venus Elementary, 6–8 attending Venus Middle School, and 9–12 attending Venus High School.  The small portion of Venus that lies in Ellis County is served by the Midlothian Independent School District or Maypearl Independent School District.

Notable people
 Judith Barrett, actress

References

External links
City of Venus official website

Towns in Johnson County, Texas
Towns in Ellis County, Texas
Towns in Texas
Dallas–Fort Worth metroplex
Populated places established in the 1880s